Eaton Creek is a stream in Thurston County in the U.S. state of Washington. It is a tributary to Lake St. Clair.

Eaton Creek has the name of Nathan Eaton, a pioneer settler.

References

Rivers of Thurston County, Washington
Rivers of Washington (state)